The Battle of Kruševac was fought on October 2, 1454 between the forces of the Serbian Despotate, allied with the Kingdom of Hungary, and the Ottoman Empire.

In 1454 the Ottomans launched a major invasion against Serbia, at the helm of which was the Sultan himself, Mehmed the Conqueror. Initially, Serbs led by Nikola Skobaljić scored a decisive victory a month earlier near Leskovac, surprising a much larger Ottoman army. On the Morava River, Sultan Mehmed II left Firuz Bey and 32,000 of his troops to resist any possible counterattacks by the Serbs south of Kruševac. The Serbs did not hesitate to make the first move and the two armies met.

The victory at Leskovac allowed John Hunyadi and Đurađ Branković to decisively strike at the isolated Ottoman Army, and launch a major offensive, ravaging Niš and Pirot, and burning down Vidin in northern Bulgaria. Nikola Skobaljić continued his forays against the Ottomans, operating between Leskovac and Priština, and won several major victories against the armies of the sultan.

Notes

References
 Babinger, Franz, William C. Hickman and Ralph Manheim, Mehmed the Conqueror and His Time, Princeton University Press, 1978.

Krusevac
Krusevac
1454 in Europe
Kruševac
1454 in the Ottoman Empire